The costovertebral angle is the acute angle formed on either side of the human back between the twelfth rib and the vertebral column.

The kidney lies directly below this area, so is the place where, with percussion, pain is elicited when the person has kidney inflammation. The presence of pain is marked as a positive Murphy's punch sign or as costovertebral angle tenderness.

References

Back anatomy